Poplar Island is an island in the River Thames in the parish of Mapledurham, Oxfordshire, near Reading, England.

The island is on the reach above Caversham Lock near Tilehurst and Appletree Eyot is very close to it. The two islands are in the middle of the river, so that navigation goes to each side of them according to the rules of the river. Poplar Island is densely covered by trees.

See also
Islands in the River Thames

References

South Oxfordshire District
Islands of the River Thames